In organic chemistry, a staggered conformation is a chemical conformation of an ethane-like moiety abcX–Ydef in which the substituents a, b, and c are at the maximum distance from d, e, and f; this requires the torsion angles to be 60°. It is the opposite of an eclipsed conformation, in which those substituents are as close to each other as possible.

Such a conformation exists in any open chain single chemical bond connecting two sp3-hybridised atoms, and is normally a conformational energy minimum. For some molecules such as those of n-butane, there can be special versions of staggered conformations called gauche and anti; see first Newman projection diagram in Conformational isomerism.

Crystal structures: The staggered/eclipsed configurations distinguish different crystalline structures of e.g. cubic/hexagonal boron nitride, and diamond/lonsdaleite.

See also
 Alkane stereochemistry
 Eclipsed conformation

References

Stereochemistry

de:Konformation